
Laguna La Porfía is a lake in the Yacuma Province, Beni Department, Bolivia. Its surface area is 58.5 km².

Lakes of Beni Department